Ikkatai Dam  is a rockfill dam located in Iwate Prefecture in Japan. The dam is used for irrigation. The catchment area of the dam is 5.6 km2. The dam impounds about 28  ha of land when full and can store 2240 thousand cubic meters of water. The construction of the dam was started on 1972 and completed in 1990.

See also
List of dams in Japan

References

Dams in Iwate Prefecture